Sommerfield is the surname of the following people:
Diane Sommerfield (1949–2001), American actress
John Sommerfield (1908–1991), British writer and activist
Rose Sommerfield (1847–1952), American teacher and activist
William F. Sommerfield (1877–1937), American businessman and politician
Charles M. Sommerfield, theoretical physicist and professor emeritus at Yale University

See also
Summerfield
Sommerfeld